The Pakistan Nuclear Power Fuel Complex (PNPFC), also known as Chemical Reprocessing Plant (CrP), is a nuclear energy and  reprocessing industrial complex for the PWR-type reactors. The NPFC-I is a dual purpose nuclear power plant, with a net capacity of 1000 MWe, located 175 km south of Islamabad. The reactor is designed for converting U3O8 to natural UF6, and enriched UF6 into  powder, then converted depleted UF6 into depleted uranium metal and produced zircon ingot. The PNPFC is ingeniously constructed by the Pakistan Atomic Energy Commission (PAEC) under the IAEA terms, as IAEA is funding this megaproject.

History 

In 1978, PAEC had built its own dual purpose nuclear reprocessing plant, near at Nilore, and it is known as The New Labs. Since then, PAEC has built an extensive nuclear infrastructure in the country, under the direction of Munir Ahmad Khan.

IN 2006, PAEC announced its plans for the establishment of a $1.2 billion complex consisting of separate civil, enrichment, and fuel fabrication plants. It was to be constructed under IAEA guidelines, and was to be run separately from the existing facilities. According to the plan, the enrichment plant would be constructed at Chak Jhumra in Faisalabad District. In five years, it was to have a capacity of 150,000 separative work units/year. Future plans pointed at increase of capacity in 150,000 SWU increments until it could supply a third of the enrichment needs of a 8800 MWe plant by the year 2030.

The Pakistan Nuclear Power Fuel Complex is being built for the production of nuclear fuel for the nuclear power plants to generate energy. The PNPFC is under IAEA safeguards and managed separately from Pakistan's nuclear weapons facilities. It has 1000 MW capacity and, since 2009, the 90% of work on the plant is complete and it should supply fuel in late 2010. Cost of the Pakistan Nuclear Power Fuel Complex (PNPFC) was originally estimated at Rs. 51.298 billion. The complex will fabricate fuel for local nuclear power plants, in particular for the reactors at Chashma Nuclear Power Plant. The Nuclear Power Fuel Facility consists of chemical processing plants, nuclear reprocessing plant, an enrichment plant, a seamless tube plant, a fuel fabrication plant; and a nuclear fuel testing facility.

See also

 Chashma Nuclear Power Plant
 China-Pakistan Power Plant Corporation
 Karachi Nuclear Power Plant
 Pakistan Atomic Energy Commission

References

External links

Nuclear power in Pakistan
Nuclear power stations in Pakistan
Nuclear reprocessing sites
Pakistan Atomic Energy Commission